The 2011 SEABA Under-16 Championship is the qualifying tournament for Southeast Asia Basketball Association at the 2011 FIBA Asia Under-16 Championship. The tournament was held on Banting, Kuala Langat, Malaysia from August 9 to August 13. The Philippines swept all of their assignments en route to their maiden championship title and qualified for the 2011 FIBA Asia Under-16 Championship together with 2nd placer Malaysia and 3rd placer Indonesia.

Round robin

Final standings

Awards

References

 Results
 Results

2011
International basketball competitions hosted by Malaysia
2011–12 in Malaysian basketball